Jasmine Lydia Bligh (20 May 1913 – 21 July 1991) was one of the first three BBC Television Service presenters in the 1930s. Along with Leslie Mitchell and Elizabeth Cowell, she provided continuity announcements introducing programmes in-vision.

Early life and pre-war career
Bligh was born in London, England and was the niece of Esme Ivo Bligh, the 9th Earl of Darnley, and also said by her biography at the National Portrait Gallery to be a descendant of Captain William Bligh, the commander famously usurped in the Mutiny on the Bounty in the 18th century.

Intending to begin a career as an actress, Bligh met with some opposition from her mother. However, she became a Charlot showgirl at the Cambridge Theatre, London, aged 17. Five years later, Bligh was struggling as an actress, and answered a BBC advertisement for female television 'hostess-announcers' - unmarried and without red hair. Both Bligh and Elizabeth Cowell were selected from 1,122 applicants from the British Empire. Along with Leslie Mitchell, they were seen during test transmissions from Alexandra Palace in 1936.

Post-war career
She rejoined the service in 1946 when television broadcasts resumed after the Second World War and was the first person to appear when broadcasting was resumed, greeting viewers with the words:"Good afternoon everybody. How are you? Do you remember me, Jasmine Bligh?" After twenty minutes she introduced the Mickey Mouse cartoon Mickey's Gala Premiere (1933), which had been the last programme shown before the embryonic service closed in September 1939.

Her theatrical experience, however, proved very useful as she had to learn 400 words a day to speak directly to the camera. The press, at that time, described Bligh and Cowell as 'Twin Paragons', and Bligh continued when the BBC began its regular television service a year later. She became a personality in her own right, amongst other daring escapades, she was seen being given a fireman's lift and hurtling about in a motorcycle sidecar.

Later she presented the BBC's Television for Deaf Children in the 1950s. She continued to work in television up until the 1970s, when she was a presenter of Good Afternoon for Thames Television.

Personal life and death
She married first in 1940, Lt-Col Sir John Paley Johnson, 6th Bt. In 1942 they had a daughter, Sarah. The couple were divorced in 1947. She married secondly in 1948, Frank Hugh Shirley Fox; they divorced in 1953. She later married Howard Marshall. His illness in 1967 led her to look for a new way of earning money. She set up a second-hand clothes shop, called "Bargain", and sold off her wealthy friends' clothes that they no longer required. Howard Marshall died in 1973. In 1981, a stroke left Bligh with speech difficulty. She died ten years later, aged 78.

See also

Olga Edwardes

References

External links
National Portrait Gallery | Jasmine Bligh 

1913 births
1991 deaths
British television presenters
History of television in the United Kingdom
Place of birth missing
Place of death missing
Radio and television announcers